For applied mathematics, in nonlinear control theory, a non-linear system of the form  is said to satisfy the small control property if for every  there exists a  so that for all  there exists a  so that the time derivative of the system's Lyapunov function is negative definite at that point.

In other words, even if the control input is arbitrarily small, a starting configuration close enough to the origin of the system can be found that is asymptotically stabilizable by such an input.

References

Nonlinear control